The 2017 Letran Knights men's basketball team represented Colegio de San Juan de Letran in the 93rd season of the National Collegiate Athletic Association in the Philippines. The men's basketball tournament for the school year 2017-18 began on July 8, 2017, and the host school for the season was San Sebastian College–Recoletos.

The Knights finished the double round-robin eliminations tied with the Arellano Chiefs and San Sebastian Stags at fourth to sixth-place finish with 9 wins against 9 losses. The Knights underwent a series of classification matches to determine the fourth-seeded team. The Knights then defeated the Chiefs, but faltered against the Stags. The Knights then missed the Final Four playoffs for two consecutive seasons.

Roster 

 Depth chart Depth chart

Roster changes 
Most of the key players from Season 91 championship team have left the team, namely Jom Sollano, McJour Luib, and Felix Apreku. Holdovers were Rey Nambatac, Bong Quinto, Jerrick Balanza, and JP Calvo. Added to the roster was Jeremiah Taladua, transferee from Lyceum of the Philippines University. Taladuah played in the NCAA for the Pirates last 2013 & 2014 seasons.

Injuries 

 Jeo Ambohot suffered a fracture on his right wrist during the game against San Sebastian Stags. Ambohot received a hard foul from Stags forward JM Calma and landed badly on his right wrist.

NCAA Season 93 games results 

Elimination games were played in a double round-robin format. All games were aired on ABS-CBN Sports and Action.

Source: Pong Ducanes, Imperium Technology

References 

Letran Knights basketball team seasons